Guillermo Gonzalo Giacomazzi Suárez (born 21 November 1977) is a Uruguayan football coach and former player.

He holds the Serie A appearances record for Lecce with 178 matches played. He also played for the Uruguay national team.

Playing career
He started in Uruguay, playing for Bella Vista before moving to Peñarol. In 2001, he was signed by U.S. Lecce and made his debut match in Italian Serie A on August 27, 2001, against Parma, a game which Lecce drew 1-1. He played for the team for the following 6 years, becoming its captain.

On January 31, 2007, he was signed by U.S. Città di Palermo. On February 11, 2007, he played his first Serie A match for Palermo, against Empoli F.C. In the following season he was loaned to Empoli, and in 2008 he returned to the Lecce squad. On 6 July 2010, he signed a new 4-year contract with Lecce.

Giacomazzi stayed with Lecce in 2012 despite their relegation from Serie A in 2011-12 and subsequent expulsion from the Serie B for their part in the Calcio Scommesse scandal. Giacomazzi, the club's captain, rejected offers from Serie A sides Parma and Torino and Serie B team Cesena to remain at the club.

In 2013, he joined Siena, a team that at the end of the season was excluded from the Serie B due to financial problems. Thus he became a free agent and joined A.C. Perugia for the 2014–15 Serie B season.

Coaching career
On 15 February 2020, Giacomazzi was announced as one of the two assistants to head coach Devis Mangia in charge of the Malta national football team. On 11 October 2022, he rescinded his contract with the Malta Football Federation, and subsequently joined Serie B club SPAL as Daniele De Rossi's technical collaborator. He was relieved from his post, together with De Rossi and his entire staff, on 14 February 2023.

Personal life
In addition to his native Uruguayan citizenship, Giacomazzi is also an Italian citizen since 2004. He is married to an Italian woman from Lecce, with whom he had two children.

His son Sebastián (born 2006) is a youth footballer for Lecce, and has been called up to join the Uruguay national under-20 football team in 2022.

In August 2022, Giacomazzi became a grandfather after his daughter Stephanie, partner of Lecce player Antonino Gallo, gave birth to a child.

References

External links
Giacomazzi's profile at US Palermo website

1977 births
Living people
Uruguayan footballers
Uruguay international footballers
Uruguayan expatriate footballers
C.A. Bella Vista players
Peñarol players
U.S. Lecce players
Palermo F.C. players
Empoli F.C. players
A.C.N. Siena 1904 players
A.C. Perugia Calcio players
Uruguayan Primera División players
Serie A players
Serie B players
Serie C players
Expatriate footballers in Italy
Uruguayan expatriate sportspeople in Italy
Association football midfielders
Footballers from Montevideo
Uruguayan sportspeople of Italian descent